Mount Kit Carson is a mountain in the northwest United States, located in Spokane County, Washington, northeast of Spokane, with a summit elevation of  above sea level.

1962 Plane crash
On September 10, 1962, a U.S. Air Force KC-135 Stratotanker was descending for a landing at Fairchild Air Force Base west of Spokane when it flew into a fog-shrouded ravine on Mount Kit Carson. The aircraft was based at Ellsworth AFB in South Dakota and all forty-four aboard were killed. It was the worst aviation accident in U.S. history (at the time) and as of October 2012, remains the 3rd worst accident (currently) involving a KC-135. It was attributed to a navigational error by the crew.

References

External links

Mountains of Spokane County, Washington
Mountains of Washington (state)